Borys Piotr Budka (born 11 March 1978 in Czeladź) is a Polish politician, member of Sejm of the 7th, 8th and 9th legislature, Minister of Justice in 2015, vice-president of the Civic Platform political party in the 2016–2020 period, leader of the parliamentary political group of Civic Coalition since 2019, leader of the Civic Platform from 2020 to 2021.

Memoir 
Budka is son of Józef and Maria. In 2002 he graduated Faculty of Law and Administration at the University of Silesia in Katowice. In 2007 Budka began practice as Legal Counsel. In 2011, at the University of Economics in Katowice, based on the Kwalifikacje pracownicze w stosunku pracy, he obtained a PhD in economics with a specialization in employment policy. Since graduation, he has been working as an academic teacher at the Department of Law at the Faculty of Finance and Insurance of the University of Economics.

Local Councilor 
Since 2002 he obtained the mandate of a local councilor in Zabrze. In 2002 and 2010 he was a local councilor belonging to Civic Platform. In 2006 he held the same function belonging to local committee. In 2002-2005 he was a vice leader of Gliwce City Council. In 2014 Budka was a candidate for the presidential election of Gliwice. He took third place (6192 votes).

Parliamentarian 
In 2011 Borys Budka obtained a parliamentary mandate (Civic Platform) in Gliwice constituency. He got 10 260 votes. 30 April 2015 Prime Minister Ewa Kopacz announced his candidacy as Minister of Justice. He held this position on 4 May 2015. In parliament of the 8th term of office, he became a member of the Justice and Human Rights Committee and the Legislative Committee, and also became the co-leader of the Special Committee for Changes in Codifications. He was also appointed by the parliament to the National Council of the Judiciary. On 26 February 2016, Borys Budka held a position of co-leader of Civic Platform's parliamentary club. On 12 November 2019, he became the new leader of the Civic Coalition parliamentary club. On 3 January 2020 he announced his start in the election as leader of the Civic Platform. On 25 January 2020, he was elected chairman of the Civic Platform, defeating Tomasz Siemoniak, Bogdan Zdrojewski and Bartłomiej Sienkiewicz in the first round of elections. He officially took the office on 29 January 2020, when the official election results were announced. He replaced the current party leader Grzegorz Schetyna. In 2020 he officially supports Małgorzata Kidawa-Błońska in the presidential election.

Private life 
Privately he got married with Katarzyna Kuczyńska-Budka, who is local councilor in Gliwice. He is a long-distance runner, he runs in street running. He achieved his life record in a marathon (2 hours 39 minutes, 3 seconds) in 2009 in the first edition of the Silesia Marathon.

References

Members of the Polish Sejm 2011–2015
Members of the Polish Sejm 2015–2019
Members of the Polish Sejm 2019–2023
1978 births
Civic Platform politicians
Living people
People from Czeladź
Civic Coalition (Poland)